This was the first edition of the tournament.

Timur Khabibulin and Aleksandr Nedovyesov won the title after defeating Mikhail Elgin and Denis Istomin 7–6(9–7), 6–2 in the final.

Seeds

Draw

References
 Main Draw

Astana Challenger Capital Cup - Doubles